Narcisse Leven (15 October 18336 January 1915) was a lawyer by profession.

He was one of the original founders of the Alliance israélite universelle (AIU). He was its general secretary from 1863 to 1883, its vice-president from 1883 to 1898, and its president beginning in 1898.

Narcisse, Manitoba, Canada was also named after Leven, who was then the president of the Jewish Colonization Association, by the residents of Bender Hamlet, a Jewish farm colony located 2 km east of Narcisse.

External links
The AIU website 
Entry in the Jewish Encyclopedia for Narcisse Leven
Entry in the Universal Jewish Encyclopedia for Narcisse Leven

Politicians from Paris
19th-century French Jews
1833 births
1915 deaths
Burials at Montmartre Cemetery
Democratic Republican Alliance politicians
Lycée Henri-IV alumni